Todd Owen Cantwell (born 27 February 1998) is an English professional footballer who plays as a midfielder for  club Rangers.

Cantwell began his career at Norwich City, joining the club at under-10 level in 2008 and making his first-team debut in January 2018. He made 129 appearances for Norwich over six seasons and had loan spells at Fortuna Sittard and AFC Bournemouth. He joined Rangers in January 2023.

Cantwell played youth international football for England at under-17 and under-21 levels.

Club career

Norwich City
Cantwell was born in Dereham, Norfolk, and attended Northgate High School. He joined the Norwich City Academy at under-10 level in 2008. He was shortlisted for the Premier League 2 player of the season award for the 2016–17 season. In October 2017, he was named as a substitute for two Norwich City matches, but did not make an appearance. He made his senior debut in January 2018, in an FA Cup match against Chelsea at Stamford Bridge. In the same month, he was loaned to Dutch club Fortuna Sittard for the rest of the season.

Cantwell made his first start for Norwich City in the team's first round EFL Cup match against Stevenage on 14 August 2018. He made his Norwich City league debut in September 2018 against Reading. In December 2018, he scored his first senior goal in a 3–1 victory over Rotherham United. He had his contract extended by Norwich at the end of the 2018–19 season, after the club exercised a one-year option.  On 17 August 2019, he assisted two Teemu Pukki goals, as Norwich beat Newcastle United 3–1.

On 31 January 2022, Cantwell joined AFC Bournemouth on loan until the end of the season. Bournemouth chose not to buy him at the end of his loan deal, and so he returned to Norwich. He signed a one-year contract extension with Norwich for the 2022–23 season.

Rangers
On 23 January 2023, Cantwell joined Scottish Premiership club Rangers for an undisclosed fee. He scored his first goal for the club on 18 March 2023 in a 4-2 win against Motherwell.

International career
Cantwell represented the England under-17 team at the 2014 Nordic tournament, making his debut against Iceland and scoring in a draw against Finland. He scored one goal in four appearances in total at under-17 level.

On 30 August 2019, Cantwell was included in the England under-21 squad for the first time and made his debut as a 61st-minute substitute for Morgan Gibbs-White during the 2021 U21 EURO 2–0 qualifying win over Kosovo at Hull City on 9 September 2019. In March 2021, he was included in the England squad for the group stage matches of the 2021 UEFA European Under-21 Championship. He was a late call-up to replace Mason Greenwood, who was ruled out by injury. Cantwell made four appearances in total for the under-21 team.

Career statistics

Honours
Norwich City
EFL Championship: 2018–19, 2020–21

References

External links

Profile at the Rangers F.C. website

1998 births
Living people
People from Dereham
Footballers from Norfolk
English footballers
Association football midfielders
Norwich City F.C. players
Fortuna Sittard players
AFC Bournemouth players
Rangers F.C. players
Eerste Divisie players
English Football League players
Premier League players
Scottish Professional Football League players
England youth international footballers
England under-21 international footballers
English expatriate footballers
Expatriate footballers in the Netherlands
English expatriate sportspeople in the Netherlands